Wilhelm Fridolin Volkmann [later the title Ritter von Volkmar was appended to his name] (September 25, 1821 – January 13, 1877) was an Austrian philosopher and psychologist.

Biography
He was born and educated in Prague. In 1846 he became a lecturer in aesthetics, afterwards in philosophy, at the University of Prague, and in 1856 was appointed to a professorship in philosophy there. His chief studies were in the exact psychology of the school of Herbart, for whose general principles Volkmann was probably the most conspicuous expounder.

Volkmann's most important publication is the Lehrbuch der Psychologie vom Standpunkte des philosophischen Realismus (Treatise on Psychology from the Standpoint of Philosophical Realism, 1856; 4th ed., by Cornelius, 1894–95).  In its first edition it was called Grundriss ... (Outline ...).

Notes

References
 
 
Attribution
 

1821 births
1877 deaths
Austrian knights
Austrian philosophers
Austrian psychologists
Charles University alumni
Academic staff of Charles University